Shakariat (also Romanized as Shakarīāt, Shakarīyāt, Shekarīāt, Shekarīyāt, Shikeriyat, and Shokrīāt) is a village in Azadeh Rural District, Moshrageh District, Ramshir County, Khuzestan Province, Iran. At the 2006 census, its population was 771, in 149 families.

References 

Populated places in Ramshir County